Delbert Duane Thiessen is an American psychology professor emeritus whose research focused on evolutionary mechanisms of reproduction and social communication. Del Wolf Thiessen, Ph.D., Born: August 13, 1932 Died:February 9, 2022
Professor Emeritus Psychology at University of Texas at Austin, Texas.

Academic Interests:
 Evolution, Evolutionary Psychology
 Animal and Human Communication
 Deviant Human Behavior (psychopathy)
 Demographic, Historical, and Cultural Influences on Behavior
 Editor: Agave Publishers.com (fiction and non-fiction books)
 Website and Blog: www.darksideofthebrain.com

Theoretical Interests:
 The place of emergent behavior in the evolution of complex species.
 New and old ideas for the genesis, development, and mechanisms
 of the deviant mind
 History, literature, and sociological perspectives of psychopathic behavior.

Education

Thiessen studied at University of Denver and San Jose State University, completing his Ph.D. in biopsychology at the University of California, Berkeley. He then did research at Scripps Clinic and Research Foundation in La Jolla, California before taking a position at University of Texas at Austin. He is Professor of evolutionary psychology and member of the Institute of Neuroscience. He conducted research on the genetics of alcoholism at Scripps Clinic and Research Foundation in La Jolla, California. He is Fellow of the American Psychological Association and Fellow of the American Association for the Advancement of Science. At the University of Texas he taught Comparative Psychology and investigated animal communication and human biology and behavior. He continues his investigations of human deviant behaviors, writes fiction and non-fiction, and publishes a weekly blog: www.darksideofthebrain.com. His hobbies include exploring history and literature, playing blues harmonica, and enjoying billiards.

Education and Professional History:
 1960-1961 Public Health Fellow, MF 11, 174, Sponsored by Drs. David a Rodgers and Gerald E. McClearn, Univ. Berkeley
 1961, Summer Public Health Fellow, Behavior Genetics Jackson Laboratories, Bar Harbor, Maine, Sponsored by Dr. John L. Fuller
 1961 Public Health Fellow, MF 11,174, Sponsor Dr. Gerald E. McClearn, UC, Berkeley
 1962 Fellow, Summer Institute in Behavior Genetics, UC, Berkeley
 1963. Thiessen received his Ph.D. in Physiological Psychology at UC, Berkeley. His graduate studies were sponsored by Gerald McClearn, David Rodgers, Frank Beach, and Peter Marler.
 1962-1965 Assistant Professor, Section of Medical Psychology, Division of Psychiatry, Scripps Clinic & Research Foundation, La Jolla, CA
 1964 Instructor, Physiological Psychology, Univ. Calif. Extension, La Jolla
 1965-1967 Assistant Professor & Assistant Chair, Dept. Psychology, Univ. Texas at Austin
 1968-1971 Associate Professor, Dept. Psychology, Univ. Texas at Austin
 1971-2001 Professor, Dept. Psychology, Univ. Texas at Austin
 2001–Present Professor Emeritus, Dept. Psychology, Univ. Texas at Austin.

Publication

Thiessen published five books on behavior genetics and over 250 articles in animal and human behavior.
Publications include about 250 research publication, 200 conference presentations, and a number of books published individually and with a number of professional colleagues. Books published include:
 Manosevitz, M., Lindzey, G., & Thiessen, D.D. (eds), Behavioral Genetics:Method and research. New York: Appleton-Century-Crofts, 1969
 Lindzey, G. & Thiessen, D.D. (eds) Contributions to behavior-genetic analysis:The mouse as a prototype. New York: Appleton-Century-Crofts, 1970
 Thiessen, D.D. Gene organization and behavior. New York: Random House 1972
 Thiessen, D.D. The evolution and biochemistry of aggression. Springfield, Ill., C.C. Thomas, 1976
 Thiessen, D.D. & Yahr, P. The gerbil in behavioral investigations: Mechanisms of territoriality and olfactory communication. Austin: Univ. Texas Press, 1977
 Thiessen, D. Bittersweet Destiny: The Stormy Evolution of Human Behavior. New Brunswick, Transaction Publishers, 1996. Republished as paperback with new preface, 2012
 Thiessen, W. Slip-ups and the Dangerous Mind: Seeing through and living beyond the psychopath. Amazon.com. Create Space, 2012
 Thiessen, D. (Wolf). Psychopaths Rising: Unholy links between civilization and destruction, In Press, Amazon.com. Create Space, 2013
 Thiessen, D. Universal Desires & Fears: The deep history of sociobiology. Gaea Publishing Co (Agave Publishing Co LLC 1997. Republished as Sociobiology Compendium: Aphorisms, Saying, Asides. New Brunswick, Transaction Publishers, 1998
 Thiessen, D. Survival of the Fittest: The Darwinian diet and exercise program. Morgan Printing (Agave Publishing Co LLC), 1998
 Thiessen, W. Night of the Dagger (original Haitian Voodoo artwork by Edouard Wah), Agave Publishers LLC, 2005

Appointments

He is a Fellow of the American Psychological Association, Fellow of the American Association for the Advancement of Science, a member of the American Psychological Society, the National Association of Scholars, Human Behavior and Evolution Society, Southwestern Comparative Psychological Association, the Society for the Study of Social Policies, International Society for Research on Aggression, the European Sociobiological Society, and the Behavior Genetics Association.
In 1967, at the University of Texas, Thiessen was awarded a five-year Career Development from National Institutes of Mental Health (NIMH) to study gene substitutions on behavior and physiology of mice. Over the years he has held appointments as research article reviewer, editor, or membership in a number of professional organizations, including
 
 Phi Kappa Phi
 American Association for the Advancement of Science
 Alumni Association, Roscoe B. Jackson Memorial Laboratory, Bar Harbor, ME
 American Psychological Association
 Sigma Xi
 Psychonomic Society
 Animal Behavior Society
 Southwestern Psychological Association
 International Society for Developmental Psychobiology
 Evolution and Behavior
 Behavior Genetics Association
 International Society for Research on Aggression
 The National Association of Scholars
 Who's Who in America
 In 1969 he received a three-year award by the Russell Sage Foundation to help develop behavior genetic studies at the Center for Behavior Genetics and Evolution at the University of Texas. Beginning in 1970 and lasting approximately 25 years, Thiessen received continuing research support from NIMH to conduct behavior genetic and pheromone research on mice and gerbils. During this period he also served for eight years on NIMH research study committees evaluating research applications for psychological research from NIMH. In 1975 he was awarded research funds from the University Research Institute at the Univ. Texas at Austin. Thiessen is currently Fellow of the American Psychological Association and Fellow of the American Association for the Advancement of Science. His first novel, The Devil's Song, reached the 2011 semi-finals in competition at Amazon.com. A recent publication is Slip-ups and the Dangerous Mind: Seeing Through and Living Beyond the Psychopath (Create Space: Amazon.com. 2012).

Activities
In 1994 he was one of 52 signatories on "Mainstream Science on Intelligence," an editorial written by Linda Gottfredson and published in The Wall Street Journal, which declared the consensus of the signing scholars on issues related to intelligence research following the publication of the book The Bell Curve.
Additional Activities:
 Interest in theory building in the principles of genetic and evolutionary roots of survival mechanisms and reproductive strategies with emphasis on sociobiology, communication, and mate selection.
 Studies of contemporary contingencies associated with social dominance and reproduction.
 Perspectives on psychopathic and Machiavellian relations to leadership and deviant behaviors.
 Writing non-fiction and fiction pieces and developing a website and blog: www.darksideofthebrain.com.

Selected works 
Thiessen D (1996). Bittersweet Destiny: The Stormy Evolution of Human Behavior. Transaction Publishers.

References

External links 
Delbert Thiessen page via University of Texas at Austin

Living people
Year of birth missing (living people)
University of Denver alumni
San Jose State University alumni
University of California, Berkeley alumni
University of Texas at Austin faculty
Psychology educators
Behavior geneticists
Scripps Research
National Association of Scholars
Fellows of the American Psychological Association